The 1997 Regal Scottish Masters was a professional non-ranking snooker tournament that took place between 30 September and 5 October 1997 at the Motherwell Civic Centre in Motherwell, Scotland.

Nigel Bond recovered from 6–8 down to defeat local favorite Alan McManus 9–8.

Main draw

Final

Qualifying Event
Qualifying for the tournament took place amongst 6 players at the Spencer's Snooker Centre in Stirling from 9 to 11 September 1997.
In the first round, 1985 World Champion Dennis Taylor beat Anthony Hamilton 5–4, while former Irish Masters champion Darren Morgan whitewashed Billy Snaddon.
In the semi-finals, former Masters champion Alan McManus defeated Morgan 5–1, while world number 11 Tony Drago won 5–3 over Taylor.
In the final McManus defeated Drago 5–2, making five half-century breaks in the match, to earn a place at the main draw. All matches were played to the best-of-nine frames and players in bold indicate match winners.

Century breaks
 
 140, 119  Alan McManus
 128  Nigel Bond
 120, 105  Ronnie O'Sullivan
 119  John Parrott
 114  John Higgins
 111  Anthony Hamilton

References 

1997
Scottish Masters
Masters
Scottish Masters